Party of the Left may refer to:
The Left (Germany)
Party of the Left (France)
Party of the Left, a party of the Yale Political Union